Hyllisia delicatula is a species of beetle in the family Cerambycidae. It was described by Karl Borromaeus Maria Josef Heller in 1924.

References

delicatula
Beetles described in 1924
Taxa named by Karl Borromaeus Maria Josef Heller